Speculative grade liquidity is a liquidity rating of the rating agency Moody's indicating of an issuer's power to remain liquid over the next year. This is, to generate cash internally and externally compared to mature liabilities in the indicated timeframe.

External links
 Definition of SGL 1–4 grades

Credit scoring